Aloys Oosterwijk (born 25 June 1956 in ) is a Dutch cartoonist. He is the winner of the 2007 Stripschapprijs. Since 1996 he publishes a weekly comic strip Willems Wereld in the Dutch magazine Panorama.  Oosterwijk is also known as a courtroom sketch artist.

References

External links 
Official website - Willems Wereld 

1956 births
Living people
Dutch cartoonists
Dutch comics artists
People from Deventer
Courtroom sketch artists
Winners of the Stripschapsprijs